The 1929–30 Indiana Hoosiers men's basketball team represented Indiana University. Their head coach was Everett Dean, who was in his 6th year. The team played its home games in The Fieldhouse in Bloomington, Indiana, and was a member of the Big Ten Conference.

The Hoosiers finished the regular season with an overall record of 8–9 and a conference record of 7–5, finishing 4th in the Big Ten Conference.

Roster

Schedule/Results

|-
!colspan=8| Regular Season
|-

References

Indiana
Indiana Hoosiers men's basketball seasons
1929 in sports in Indiana
1930 in sports in Indiana